Sparrow Health System is a comprehensive, integrated health care organization located in Central Michigan. More than 900 physicians are affiliated with Sparrow Health System.

Two for profit financing organizations, the Physicians Health Plan and the Sparrow Physicians Health Plan, are owned and operated by Sparrow Health System.  Hospitals within the Sparrow Health System include Sparrow Hospital and Sparrow Specialty Hospital (Long Term Acute Care formerly located at the old St. Lawrence Hospital) in Lansing, Clinton Memorial Hospital, Carson City Hospital, Sparrow Eaton Hospital  (formerly Hayes Green Beach Hospital) and Ionia County Memorial Hospital.  The Michigan Athletic Club, located in Lansing, is also a subsidiary of Sparrow Health System.  The Sparrow Health System Laboratory performs over 3 million tests per year, at various laboratory sites, which include four remote testing facilities and thirteen patient service centers.

A portion of Sparrow employees are represented by the Michigan Nurses Association and the UAW Local 4911.

References

External links
 Sparrow Health System website
 Physicians Health Plan website

Hospital networks in the United States
Companies based in Lansing, Michigan
1912 establishments in Michigan
Medical and health organizations based in Michigan